Wilson David Morelo López (born 21 May 1987), is a Colombian football striker who plays for Categoría Primera A club Independiente Santa Fe.

Career statistics

Source:
Notes

Honours

Club
Santa Fe
Categoría Primera A (1): 2014–II
Superliga Colombiana (1): 2015
Copa Sudamericana (1): 2015

Individual
Copa Sudamericana top goalscorer (1): 2015

References

External links

1987 births
Living people
Colombian footballers
Colombian expatriate footballers
Envigado F.C. players
Millonarios F.C. players
América de Cali footballers
Atlético Huila footballers
Deportes Tolima footballers
La Equidad footballers
C.F. Monterrey players
Everton de Viña del Mar footballers
Club Atlético Colón footballers
Independiente Santa Fe footballers
Argentine Primera División players
Chilean Primera División players
Categoría Primera A players
Liga MX players
Expatriate footballers in Argentina
Expatriate footballers in Chile
Expatriate footballers in Mexico
Colombian expatriate sportspeople in Argentina
Colombian expatriate sportspeople in Chile
Colombian expatriate sportspeople in Mexico
Association football forwards
People from Montería